Cnemidophorus rostralis is a species of teiid lizard endemic to Venezuela.

References

rostralis
Reptiles of Venezuela
Endemic fauna of Venezuela
Reptiles described in 2010
Taxa named by Gabriel N. Ugueto
Taxa named by Michael B. Harvey